libhybris is a compatibility layer for computers running Linux distributions based on the GNU C library or Musl, intended for using software written for Bionic-based Linux systems, which mainly includes Android libraries and device drivers.

History 
Hybris was initially written by Carsten Munk, a Mer developer, who released it on GitHub on 5 August 2012 and publicly announced the project later that month. Munk has since been hired by Jolla as their Chief Research Engineer.

Hybris has also been picked up by the Open webOS community for WebOS Ports, by Canonical for Ubuntu Touch and by the AsteroidOS project.

In April 2013, Munk announced that Hybris has been extended to allow Wayland compositors to use graphic device drivers written for Android. Weston has had support for libhybris since version 1.3, which was released on 11 October 2013.

Features 
Hybris loads "Android libraries, and overrides some symbols from bionic with glibc" calls, making it possible to use Bionic-based software, such as binary-only Android drivers, on glibc-based Linux distributions.

Hybris can also translate Android's EGL calls into Wayland EGL calls, allowing Android graphic drivers to be used on Wayland-based systems. This feature was initially developed by Collabora's Pekka Paalanen for his Android port of Wayland.

See also 

 C standard library
 Free and open-source graphics device driver

References

External links 
 

C (programming language) libraries
C standard library
Compatibility layers
Embedded Linux
Free computer libraries
Free software programmed in C
Software using the Apache license